Sehar Khan is a Pakistani actress and model. She is known for her roles in dramas Main Agar Chup Hoon, Sanwari, Zakham, Mushk and Rang Mahal.

Early life 
She received her bachelor's degree from the University of Karachi.

Career 
She made her debut as an actress in drama Sanwari  as Shama. Then she worked in drama Naqab Zan with Ali Abbas, Hajra Yamin, Ali Ansari and Saboor Aly. Then she worked in dramas Main Agar Chup Hoon, Wafa Kar Chalay, Dikhawa Season 2 and Rang Mahal. Since then she appeared in dramas Zakham, Farq, Haqeeqat, Fasiq and Mushk. She also appeared in telefim Teri Meri Kahani as Zara with Bushra Ansari, Haroon Kadwani, Usman Peerzada and Jawed Sheikh.

Filmography

Television

Telefilm

References

External links 
 

1997 births
Pakistani television actresses
Living people
21st-century Pakistani actresses